The Neoca 2S is a 35mm rangefinder camera made in Japan in 1955 and 1956. It has a dual-stroke advance lever and a central shutter; neither feature is typical for this kind of camera. The lens is a Neokor anastigmat f=45mm/3.5. 

Shutter speeds are B and 1 sec to 1/300s. Depth of field is indicated on the lens barrel. The distance scale is in metres. It has no exposure meter. Users on internet newsgroups report the camera scratches their film.

External links 
 Mediajoy's Guide to Classic Cameras

Rangefinder cameras
135 film cameras